Some presidents of the United States have had a red call button in the Oval Office of the White House that could call aides. The button is frequently found on the Resolute desk.

During Donald Trump's presidency, the button was used to summon a butler with a Diet Coke on a silver platter, and to order lunch.

Early usage 
The earliest known usage of a “call button” was from the Lyndon Johnson presidency. Johnson had a series of buttons, or keys, to summon different drinks to the Oval Office, Cabinet Room, and "Little Lounge" (a room just next to the Oval Office). In the Oval Office the keys were on the table behind the president's desk. The four keys were for coffee, tea, Coke, and Fresca, and when pressed a butler would fulfill the president's drink request.

Modern usage

George W. Bush presidency 

President George W. Bush reportedly brought back the button in a new form to summon White House staff.

Barack Obama presidency 

According to Richard Branson, President Obama repurposed it to order tea for his White House guests.

Donald Trump presidency 

During Donald Trump's presidency, when pressed, a signal would summon a butler who would bring a Diet Coke on a silver platter; Trump reportedly also used the button to request lunch, and to pull pranks on new visitors to the White House. Donald Trump stated to one reporter that "everyone thinks it is [the nuclear button]" and that people "get a little nervous when I press that button."

Joe Biden presidency 
In the first few days of Joe Biden's presidency, it was reported that he had the button removed, however it appeared to return a few weeks later when a White House official told Politico that the button was back on the desk with an unspecified purpose.

References

Furnishings of the White House